Statistics of Emperor's Cup in the 1979 season.

Overview
It was contested by 28 teams, and Fujita Industries won the championship.

Results

1st round
Gonohe Town Hall 0–3 Toho Titanium
Nissan Motors 2–1 Kyushu Sangyo University
Yanmar Club 2–2 (PK 4–2) Nippon Steel
Hitachi 4–2 Toyota Motors
Waseda University 2–1 Tanabe Pharmaceuticals
Tokyo University of Agriculture 0–1 Teijin
Tsukuba University 3–1 Sapporo University
Mazda Auto Hiroshima 1–0 Hokusetsu Kemari-dan
Fukuoka University 0–1 Toyo Industries
Nippon Kokan 1–0 Juntendo University
Nissei Resin Industry 0–4 Furukawa Electric
Honda 3–0 Osaka University of Commerce

2nd round
Mitsubishi Motors 3–0 Toho Titanium
Nissan Motors 2–3 Yanmar Club
Hitachi 1–0 Waseda University
Teijin 0–7 Yomiuri
Fujita Industries 3–1 Tsukuba University
Mazda Auto Hiroshima 0–5 Toyo Industries
Nippon Kokan 0–0 (PK 4–5) Furukawa Electric
Honda 1–2 Yanmar Diesel

Quarterfinals
Mitsubishi Motors 2–0 Yanmar Club
Hitachi 4–0 Yomiuri
Fujita Industries 5–0 Toyo Industries
Furukawa Electric 0–3 Yanmar Diesel

Semifinals
Mitsubishi Motors 4–1 Hitachi
Fujita Industries 3–1 Yanmar Diesel

Final

Mitsubishi Motors 1–2 Fujita Industries
Fujita Industries won the championship.

References
 NHK

Emperor's Cup
Emperor's Cup
1980 in Japanese football